University Drive is a major east–west thoroughfare in Huntsville, Alabama, following US Route 72 into the city from the west.

Route Description
From the west, US 72 enters Madison County inside the city limits of Huntsville and runs east eventually running through the north tip of the city of Madison, where it splits Huntsville and Madison's city limits, with Huntsville to the north, Madison to the south. At Jeff Road, the four lane US 72 takes on the name of University Drive and passes to the south of Huntsville Memorial Gardens and over Indian Creek, where it meets Providence Main Street, where it widens to seven lanes.

Continuing east, University Drive passes through multiple shopping centers and car dealerships. University Drive meets Research Park Blvd / Alabama 255 with a six-ramp partial cloverleaf and passes just to the north of MidCity Huntsville, formerly Madison Square Mall. University Drive then passes to the south of Huntsville West Shopping Center. An overpass over Sparkman Drive with on- and off-ramps provides access to the University of Alabama in Huntsville. Following the interchange, the road runs under a pedestrian and bicycle bridge and then meets Alabama 53 / Jordan Lane.

University Drive eventually connects to Memorial Parkway, where US-72 splits off and heads north with US 231/431. Going through the intersection, University Drive narrows to five lanes and intersects Church Street, where it becomes Pratt Ave. Pratt Ave continues east, directly connecting to Five Points and then runs up Monte Sano Mountain.

Major intersections

Retail
University Drive is a major commercial thoroughfare through west Huntsville that includes a number of shopping centers, hotels, fast food locations, and other various businesses including two movie theaters, Carmike Huntsville 10 and Madison Square 12.

Shopping Centers:
 Midcity
The Fountain
 Northwood Plaza Shopping Center
 Westside Center

Major retail stores include:
 Trader Joe's
 Books-a-Million
 Best Buy
 Sam's Club
 Super Target
 Walmart Supercenter

Transportation
Access to shuttle buses provided by the city of Huntsville are available along University Drive.

See also
 Huntsville, Alabama
 Research Park Blvd
 Governors Drive
 Memorial Parkway

References 

Streets in Alabama
Roads in Alabama
Transportation in Huntsville, Alabama
U.S. Route 72